Kirsti Marjatta Manninen, (born 22 October 1952, in Seinäjoki) is a Finnish writer and screenwriter. She has produced over hundred works under her own name as well as under her pen name Enni Mustonen.

Manninen studied Finnish literature, history, language, pedagogy and journalism at the University of Helsinki.

Manninen's father is the writer , and her daughter  is also a writer. Her sons, Kusti and Jaakko, are musicians.

Manninen lives in Mäntsälä and has written about the locality's history.

References

Further reading

Kirjasampo.fi
Kirsti Manninen in Elonet
Omalähiö.fi, page 5, finnish

External links

Finnish historical novelists
Finnish crime writers
1952 births
Living people